Sipiyyəd is a village in the municipality of Dolu in the Astara Rayon of Azerbaijan.

References

Populated places in Astara District